The 2009 Indian general election in Goa, occurred for 2 seats in the state. Both UPA and NDA won one seat each.

Results
 Bharatiya Janata Party candidate Shripad Yasso Naik won the election from North Goa constituency.
 Indian National Congress candidate Francisco Sardinha won the election from South Goa constituency.

References

Indian general elections in Goa
2000s in Goa
Goa